Ahmed Ali Sheikh (born 3 October 1961) is a Pakistani jurist who is the current and 23rd Chief Justice of the Sindh High Court, in office since 15 March 2017.

References

1961 births
Living people
Judges of the Sindh High Court
Pakistani judges